Rivers FC is a Canadian semi-professional football club based in Kamloops, British Columbia that competes in League1 British Columbia.

History
The club was officially unveiled on November 5, 2021, as an inaugural license holder for the first season of the new semi-professional League1 British Columbia in 2022. The club's name is derived from the North Thompson River and South Thompson River which converge in Kamloops. The club will field teams in both the male and female divisions, and the team is affiliated with Thompson Rivers University, announcing that the head coaches of the men's and women's Thompson Rivers WolfPack teams will serve as the head coaches for the Rivers male and female teams. The team is expected to serve as a good recruiting tool for the university, as well as to keep the school's players playing in the offseason. The club is expected to use both the TRU's Hillside Stadium and McArthur Island Park as its home field. In December, they announced a relationship with youth club Thompson Okanagan FC to develop their player pathway. They also announced the formation of a reserve team, called Rivers FC II, that will play in the Pacific Coast Soccer League. 

Their inaugural matches occurred on May 22, at home, against Altitude FC for both the men and women. In their debut matches, the men's team drew 1-1, while the women won their match 2-0, with a combined attendance of over 700 watching both matches.

Players

Current squad

Personnel

Seasons

Men

Women

Notable players
The following players have either played at the professional or international level, either before or after playing for the League1 BC team:

Men

Women

References

Soccer clubs in British Columbia
Rivers
Association football clubs established in 2021
2021 establishments in British Columbia